Cyrtodactylus myaleiktaung, also known as the Mya Leik Taung bent-toed gecko, is a species of gecko endemic to Myanmar.

References

Cyrtodactylus
Reptiles described in 2018
Reptiles of Myanmar
Endemic fauna of Myanmar